Marlene Kristensen  (born 28 May 1973) is a retired Danish women's international footballer who played as a forward. She played 20 matches for Denmark women's national football team and scored one goal between 1997 and 2000. She was part of the team at the 1999 FIFA Women's World Cup. However, she played only a few minutes of one match (against North Korea), when she fell in an unfortunate manner and broke a leg.

Originally, she played in Odense, Denmark, but she also played in clubs in the United States and Australia.

References

1973 births
Living people
Danish women's footballers
Denmark women's international footballers
Place of birth missing (living people)
1999 FIFA Women's World Cup players
Women's association football forwards